Construction Time Again is the third studio album by English electronic music band Depeche Mode, released on 22 August 1983 by Mute Records. It was the band's first album to feature Alan Wilder as a member, who wrote the songs "Two Minute Warning" and "The Landscape Is Changing". The album's title comes from the second line of the first verse of the track "Pipeline". It was recorded at John Foxx's Garden Studios in London, and was supported by the Construction Time Again Tour.

Background and themes
In January 1983, shortly before the release of the "Get the Balance Right!" single, songwriter Martin Gore attended an Einstürzende Neubauten concert, giving him the idea to experiment with the sounds of industrial music in the context of pop.

This album introduced a transition in lyrical content for the group. Construction Time Again would include a bevy of political themes, sparked by the poverty Gore had seen on a then-recent trip he had taken to Thailand.

Tour

The tour, which took place in Europe, began in September 1983 in Hitchin, England. Following an initial leg of dates in the United Kingdom and Ireland, a second leg in December reached Sweden, Denmark, Belgium, the Netherlands and West Germany.

In March 1984, the group performed its first dates in Italy and Spain. The final date was a one-off show in June supporting Elton John in Ludwigshafen, West Germany, where "People Are People", the lead single from their next album, made its live debut on the special set. A tour in support of the act's subsequent studio release, Some Great Reward, followed in September.

Critical reception

On the album's politically inclined lyrics, Anne Lambert of Number One wrote: "[Martin Gore]'s protest songs are serious and sharply observed, but they retain that distinctive ear for a commercial melody". She concludes: "It's impossible to pick out tracks, as the whole effect is sharp, tight, smooth and absolutely riveting!" In Smash Hits, Peter Martin notes that the band's attention is now turned "outwards to the world (and all its problems)", pointing out the Russian, European and Oriental influences apparent in the music. He goes on: "The songs are still electronically based, but the brilliantly melodic and bouncy edge is contrasted by a brooding Tin Drum-type sparseness." Summing up, Martin calls the album "[a] brave departure."

New Musical Express hailed the album, saying that "Everything Counts" "is Mode's best ever single [...] It sold because it combines edgy and poignant melodies held in thrilling tension; a tough, urgent dancebeat; and a gleamingly modern sound with an element of quirkiness to mark it out in the crowd. And the same goes for every other track on the album." Reviewer Mat Snow qualified Alan Wilder's composition "Two Minute Warning" as "a haunting melody whose transition from verse to chorus explodes in one of those breathtakingly uplifting moments" and concluded that Depeche Mode "have made a bold and lovely pop record. Simple as that."

Commenting on the results of the band's new line-up, AllMusic's Ned Raggett considers Construction Time Again to be "a bit hit and miss... [although] when it does hit, it does so perfectly". Singling out "Love, in Itself", Raggett observes: "Depeche never sounded quite so thick with its sound before, with synths arranged into a mini-orchestra/horn section and real piano and acoustic guitar spliced in at strategic points." Regarding Alan Wilder's songwriting, Raggett states: "Wilder's... songwriting contributions are fine musically, but lyrically, 'preachy' puts it mildly, especially the environment-friendly 'The Landscape Is Changing'."

Track listing

2007 Collectors Edition (CD + DVD)

Personnel
Credits adapted from the liner notes of Construction Time Again.

 Daniel Miller – production
 Depeche Mode – production
 Andy Fletcher
 Dave Gahan
 Martin Gore
 Alan Wilder
 Gareth Jones – tonmeister
 Corinne Simcock – engineering assistance on "Two Minute Warning"
 Brian Griffin – cover photography
 Ian Wright – illustrations
 Martyn Atkins – design

Charts

Weekly charts

Year-end charts

Certifications

References

External links

 Album information from the official Depeche Mode website
 Official remaster info

1983 albums
Albums produced by Daniel Miller (music producer)
Depeche Mode albums
Mute Records albums
Sire Records albums